Telioneura hypophaea is a moth in the subfamily Arctiinae. It was described by George Hampson in 1905. It is found in Venezuela.

References

Moths described in 1905
Arctiinae